The International Centre for Democratic Transition (ICDT) is a non-profit organization founded in 2005 based in Budapest, Hungary which collects the experiences of recent democratic transitions and shares them with those who are determined to follow that same path. Instead of promoting democracy in general,
the ICDT sets more concrete and pragmatic goals. The Centre strives to show how dozens of young democracies have made and are making the transition, so that those who set off on this difficult journey from dictatorship to democracy in the future may learn from the successes as well as from the failures.

Mission statement
Because the International Centre for Democratic Transition was founded in Central Europe, we are acutely aware of the complexity of democratic transition as a process. We ourselves have recently undergone this process and know full well the fragility of new democracies. We firmly believe that a transition can only be judged to be successful when the benefits of democracy are shared by the whole of society. The ICDT's mission is to facilitate the smooth and peaceful process of democratic transition on the basis of participatory principles; the political, economic, legal, cultural, and civil societal aspects of transformation; and the socio-cultural context of regions and countries where the process takes place.

History
The idea to establish an institute to collect and share the experiences of past democratic transitions originated from former US Ambassador Mark Palmer, Vice President of the Council for a Community of Democracies (CCD). His proposal was followed by a meeting between the Hungarian Foreign Minister László Kovács and the US Secretary of State in June 2004. At a conference in Budapest in March 2005 civil society and governmental leaders from Africa, Asia, Latin America, Europe, and the United States, as well as representatives of a number of international organizations approved the concept paper on the new Centre. Subsequently, the idea was presented by the Hungarian Foreign Minister at the Third Ministerial Conference of the Community of Democracies in Santiago de Chile. Once again, the idea was well received and endorsed by the participating Foreign Ministers, representing more than 100 democratic governments of the world. Finally, in September 2005, President of Hungary László Sólyom announced at the World Summit of the United Nations that "an International Centre for Democratic Transition (ICDT) has been set up in Budapest."

Operational method
The ICDT:
 facilitates the process of democratic transition by using the knowledge pool of transitional experiences and by sharing best practices;
 convenes the most important indigenous stakeholders to play key roles in the transition process;
 provides an adaptable toolbox and appropriate models for the creation and consolidation of democratic institutions;
 mediates between cultures and regions by generating dialogue.

Key achievements
 Pursued 23 distinct projects to promote democratic transition and share best practices and lessons learned;
 Established a strong presence in Moldova with a series of high-profile projects;
 Celebrated the 20th anniversary of the 1989 democratic changes in a dignified way, with a number of conferences and high-level events;
 Reached out to over a thousand members of civil society, government officials, and media representatives;
 Earned the trust of new donors including the Governments of Estonia, Switzerland, and Luxembourg;
 Established a long-term partnership with the Helen Bader Foundation;
 Achieved broad international recognition with the publication of A European Alternative for Belarus: Report of the Belarus Task Force;
 Published an Open Letter to the Obama Administration, which attracted international attention and debate;
 Enlisted Paula J. Dobriansky, April H. Foley, Nabila Hamza, Chandrika Bandaranaike Kumaratunga, Aleksandr Kwasniewski, Dr. Péter Medgyessy, George E. Pataki, George Soros, and Dr. Vaira Vīķe-Freiberga as new international board members.

Program areas

Interregional CooperationPromoting interregional cooperation between governments and civil societies of neighboring countries to enable democratic transition and to ensure regional stability.
Toolbox for DemocracyProviding technical assistance and learning opportunities to new and fragile democracies, concentrating on particular and practical elements of democracy such as elections and freedom of speech.
Sustainable DemocracyStrengthening the involvement of marginalized groups such as minorities, women and other unprotected social groups in both the transition process and the functioning of democracy.
Research and AnalysisUnderstanding and explaining the complex process of democratic transitions in order to forecast future trends and give recommendations for projects in the centre's three program areas.

International board
The International Board of Directors of the Centre consists of prominent personalities from the areas of international politics, economics, the arts and the sciences.
Chairperson
 Janusz Onyszkiewicz, Vice-President of the European Parliament, former Minister of Defense, Poland
Members
 Madeleine Albright, former Secretary of State, chair, The Albright Group, USA
 Daniel Bader, President/CEO, Helen Bader Foundation, USA
 Donald M. Blinken, former United States Ambassador to Hungary, USA
 Nancy Brinker, former White House Chief of Protocol, Former Ambassador to Hungary, USA
 Kim Campbell, former Prime Minister, Canada
 Gustavo A. Cisneros, chairman of the Board of Directors of the Cisneros Group of Companies, USA
 Prof. Emil Constantinescu, former President of Romania 1996-2000
 Joel H. Cowan, President of Habersham & Cowan. Inc, USA
 Jayantha Dhanapala, former Under-Secretary General of the United Nations, Honorary President of the International Peace Bureau, Sri Lanka
 Paula J. Dobriansky, former Under Secretary of State for Democracy and Global Affairs, USA
 April H. Foley, former Ambassador to Hungary, USA
 György Habsburg, Archduke Georg of Austria, Ambassador, Hungary
 Nabila Hamza; President of the Foundation for the Future, Jordan
 Andrey Illarionov, Senior Fellow at the Cato Institute's Center for Global Liberty and Prosperity, USA
 President Chandrika Bandaranaike Kumaratunga, former president, Sri Lanka
 President Aleksander Kwaśniewski, former president, Poland
 President Ricardo Lagos, Former President of the Republic of Chile, Chile
 Ho-Jin Lee, former Ambassador to Hungary, South Korea
 Sonja Licht, Chair of the ICDT's executive committee, President and Founder of Belgrade Fund for Political Excellence, Serbia
 Markus Meckel, last Minister of Foreign Affairs of the GDR, Deputy Foreign Policy Speaker of the SPD, Germany
 Anatoli Mikhailov, President of EHU-International, Lithuania
 Mark Palmer, former Ambassador of the United States of America to Hungary, USA
 Governor George E. Pataki, Former Governor of New York; Co-Chairman of the Council on Foreign Relations Independent Task Force on Climate Change Issues, USA
 Thomas S. Rooney, CEO and Director, Energy Recovery Inc., USA
 Sima Samar, Chairperson, Afghanistan Independent Human Rights Commission, Afghanistan
 Narcís Serra, former Vice-President of the Spanish Government, President of CIDOB Foundation, Spain
 Prince Hassan bin Al Talal, President, Club of Rome, Jordan
 Borys Tarasyuk, Former Minister of Foreign Affairs, Ukraine
 Maximilian Teleki, President, Hungarian-American Coalition, USA
 Vaira Vīķe-Freiberga, Former President, Latvia
 Iván Vitányi, Member of Parliament, Hungary
 George Herbert Walker III, former Ambassador of the United States of America to Hungary, USA
 Sundeep Waslekar, President, Strategic Foresight Group, India
 † John C. Whitehead, Former Deputy Secretary of State, USA
Honorary Members
 Iván Bába, Administrative State Secretary of Foreign Affairs of Hungary
 Michel Barnier, Former Minister of Agriculture, France, Member of the Barroso Commission, Internal Market and Services
 Judge Alexander Boraine, former Member of the Truth and Reconciliation Commission, South Africa
 Toomas Hendrik Ilves, President, Estonia
 János Martonyi, Minister of Foreign Affairs, Hungary
 George Soros, Chairperson of Soros Fund Management, LLC and Founder of The Open Society Institute, USA
 † Bronislaw Geremek, MEP, Former Minister of Foreign Affairs, Solidarity Member, Poland

Executive committee
The executive committee of the ICDT consists of five internationally recognized figures from the scientific and public arenas, elected for a term of three years by the International Board.

Chairperson
 Sonja Licht, President and Founder of the Belgrade Fund for Political Excellence
Members
 Daniel Bader, President/CEO, Helen Bader Foundation, USA
 April H. Foley, former US Ambassador to Hungary
 Ferenc Somogyi, former Minister of Foreign Affairs of Hungary, former Ambassador to the United States
 Botond Zákonyi, Director of the Hungarian Institute of International Affairs

Governmental Advisory Board
The members of the GAB represent their governments. This body serves as an organized form of communication with the democratic governments of the world. So far over 40 democracies have delegated a representative to the ICDT's Governmental Advisory Board, which advises and appraises the work of the centre and makes proposals for specific projects.

Board of Trustees
 Victor Rico, Secretary for Political Affairs, Organization of American States (OAS)
 Mira Hoxha, Ambassador to Hungary, Albania
 John Griffin, Ambassador to Hungary, Australia
 Michael Zimmermann, Ambassador to Hungary, Austria
 Pierre Labouverie, Ambassador to Hungary, Belgium
 Nicola Ðukić, Ambassador to Hungary, Bosnia and Herzegovina
 Evgenia Koldanova, Deputy Minister of Foreign Affairs, Bulgaria
 Tamara Lynne Guttman, Ambassador to Hungary, Canada
 Ivan Bandić, Ambassador to Hungary, Croatia
 Gabriela Dlouhá, Director at the Ministry of Foreign Affairs, Human Rights & Transition Policy Department, Czech Republic
 Priit Pallum, Ambassador to Hungary, Estonia
 Hannu Kyröläinen, Director General, Department for Global Affairs, Ministry of Foreign Affairs, Finland
 Zviad Chumburidze, Ambassador to Hungary, Georgia
 Spyridon Georgiles, Ambassador to Hungary, Greece
 Gauri Shankar Gupta, Ambassador to Hungary, India
 Gian B. Campagnola, Ambassador to Hungary, Italy
 Tetsuo Ito, Ambassador to Hungary, Japan
 Makram Mustafa Queisi, Ambassador accredited to Hungary, Jordan
 Dorothy Angote, Permanent Secretary, Ministry of Lands, Kenya
 Chung-Ha Suh, Ambassador to Hungary, Republic of Korea
 Shkëndije Sherifi, Ambassador to Hungary, Kosovo
 Veronika Erte, Ambassador to Hungary, Latvia
 Renatas Juška, Ambassador to Hungary, Lithuania
 Marc Courte, Ambassador to Hungary, Luxembourg
 Alexandru Codreanu, Ambassador to Hungary, Moldova
 Ochir Enkhtsetseg, Ambassador to the United Nations, Mongolia
 Vesko Garčević, Political Director, Ministry of Foreign Affairs, Montenegro
 Robert Milders, Ambassador to Hungary, the Netherlands
 Siri Ellen Sletner, Ambassador to Hungary, Norway
 Roman Kowalski, Ambassador to Hungary, Poland
 António Augusto Jorge Mendes, Ambassador to Hungary, Portugal
 Bogdan Mazuru, State Secretary for European Affairs, Ministry of Foreign Affairs, Romania
 Damjan Krnjevic-Miskovic, Advisor of the Minister of Foreign Affairs, Serbia
 Peter Weiss, Ambassador to Hungary, Slovakia
 Darja Bavdaž Kuret, Ambassador to Hungary, Slovenia
 Enrique Pastor de Gana, Ambassador to Hungary, Spain
 Karin Ulrika Olofsdotter, Ambassador to Hungary, Sweden
 Martin Michelet, Head of the Human Rights Policy Section of the Federal Department of Foreign Affairs, Switzerland
 Rwekaza Sympho Mukandala, Executive Chairperson of the Research on Democracy and Education, Tanzania
 Hasan Kemal Gür, Ambassador to Hungary, Turkey
 Yurii Mushka, Ambassador to Hungary, Ukraine
 Gregory Dorey, Ambassador to Hungary, United Kingdom
 Angela Kane, Under-Secretary-General for Management, United Nations
 Eleni Tsakopoulos Kounalakis, Ambassador to Hungary, United States of America

Advisors
 Cesar D. Beltran, Senior Advisor
 Armando Marques Guedes, Senior Advisor
 André Erdős, Senior Advisor
 Attila Komlós, Senior Advisor
 Sándor Köles, Senior Advisor

Staff
 István Gyarmati, President of the Center for Democracy Public Foundation
 Gáspár Várkonyi, Managing Director of the Center for Democracy Public Foundation
 László Várkonyi, President of the International Centre for Democratic Transition

References

External links
The International Centre for Democratic Transition (ICDT) ICDT Homepage

Promoting Democratic Transition Worldwide in 2008 ICDT Brochure 2008

ICDT Publications
Minorities in Transition in South, Central, and Eastern Europe ICDT Papers No. 1.
Democratic Change and Gender: The 'Foremother Exercise 
A European Alternative for Belarus - Report of the Belarus Task Force ; in Russian: ; in Belarusian: ICDT Newsletters'
ICDT Newsletter April 2008: 
ICDT Newsletter June 2008: 
ICDT Newsletter September 2008: 
ICDT Newsletter December 2008: 
ICDT Newsletter February 2009: 
ICDT Newsletter April 2009: 

Democratization
Organizations established in 2005
Think tanks based in Hungary